Helena Early (1 April 18881977), was the first woman solicitor to practice in Ireland.

Biography
Helena Early was born to Peter Early and Mary Ann Reilly on 1 April 1888 in Swords. She had a number of older siblings. One, her brother Thomas, was a solicitor. Early worked as a Law clerk for her brother and took the Preliminary Examination in January 1920 where she placed first. She later came first in the Intermediate Examination and fourth in the Final. Early was indentured to her brother on 22 June 1920 after applying for a practicing certificate in 1919. She was admitted to the Roll of Solicitors in 1923 (although Dorothea Heron was the first woman to join the roll of solicitors on the 17 April 1923). In 1920 Early was the Auditor of the Solicitors’ Apprentices Debating Society.

Early had a practice on O’Connell Street, Dublin. She was politically active. Early was President of the Ireland–U.S.S.R. Friendship Society which was active through the 1950s. Early retired during the '60s. She died in 1977.

Sources

1888 births
1977 deaths
Irish women lawyers